Below are the rosters for teams competing in the 2015 World Junior Ice Hockey Championships.

Group A

Head coach:  Benoit Groulx

Head coach:  Pat Cortina

Head coach:  Hannu Jortikka

Head coach:  Ernest Bokroš

Head coach:  Mark Osiecki

Group B

Head coach:  Miroslav Přerost

Head coach:  Olaf Eller

Head coach:  Valeri Bragin

Head coach:  Rikard Grönborg

Head coach:  John Fust

External links
worldjunior2015.com

Rosters
World Junior Ice Hockey Championships rosters